Craig Sandercock is an Australian rugby league coach who works as an assistant coach for the Canterbury-Bankstown Bulldogs in the NRL. He was previously the head coach of Super League team Hull Kingston Rovers.

Coaching career
Sandercock taught Human Society and its Environment (HSIE) subjects at The Pittwater House Schools in Sydney, alongside his role on the coaching staff of the Manly-Warringah Sea Eagles before joining the Newcastle Knights in 2010 to be an assistant coach.

In 2012 he was appointed the head coach of Hull Kingston Rovers. On 3 July 2014 he was released by Hull KR.

On 8 September 2014, it was announced that Sandercock would be returning to the Newcastle Knights as assistant coach to newly appointed head coach Rick Stone.

After a year with the Knights, Sandercock joined the Wests Tigers for 2016 as an assistant coach to head coach Jason Taylor.

References

Australian rugby league coaches
Hull Kingston Rovers coaches